Cadmium nitrate describes any of the related members of a family of inorganic compounds with the general formula Cd(NO3)2.\mathit{x}H2O, the most commonly encountered form being the tetrahydrate.  The anhydrous form is volatile, but the others are colourless crystalline solids that are deliquescent, tending to absorb enough moisture from the air to form an aqueous solution.  Like other cadmium compounds, cadmium nitrate is known to be carcinogenic.

Uses
Cadmium nitrate is used for coloring glass and porcelain and as a flash powder in photography.

Preparation
Cadmium nitrate is prepared by dissolving cadmium metal or its oxide, hydroxide, or carbonate, in nitric acid followed by crystallization:
 CdO + 2HNO3 → Cd(NO3)2 + H2O
 CdCO3 + 2 HNO3 → Cd(NO3)2 + CO2 + H2O
 Cd + 4 HNO3 → 2 NO2 + 2 H2O + Cd(NO3)2

Reactions
Thermal dissociation at elevated temperatures produces cadmium oxide and oxides of nitrogen.  When hydrogen sulfide is passed through an acidified solution of cadmium nitrate, yellow cadmium sulfide is formed.  A red modification of the sulfide is formed under boiling conditions.

When with caustic soda solution, cadmium oxide forms precipitate of cadmium hydroxide.  Many insoluble cadmium salts are obtained by such precipitation reactions.

References

External links

Cadmium compounds
Nitrates
Deliquescent substances
IARC Group 1 carcinogens